Tubular Bells III, The Premiere Performance is a live concert video by Mike Oldfield released in 1998.

It was released on VHS and Laserdisc in 1998, and later packaged with Tubular Bells II Live on DVD, which was certified Gold in UK.

Concert 
The video is a full faithful performance from the premiere concert of the Tubular Bells III album at Horse Guards Parade, London, and was released by Warner Music. The concert finishes with encores of "Secrets" and "Far Above the Clouds". "Tubular Bells Part one", "Moonlight Shadow" and "Family Man" were also performed during the encore, but due to these being written by Oldfield when he was with Virgin Records they do not appear on the video.

During the performance of "Man in the Rain" the lights unexpectedly cut out. Oldfield's former Virgin record boss, Richard Branson, was also in the audience.

Track listing 
 "The Source of Secrets"
 "The Watchful Eye"
 "Jewel in the Crown"
 "Outcast"
 "Serpent Dream"
 "The Inner Child"
 "Man in the Rain"
 "The Top of the Morning"
 "Moonwatch"
 "Secrets"
 "Far Above the Clouds"
 "Secrets" (Reprise)
 "Far Above the Clouds" (Reprise)

Personnel 
 Mike Oldfield - guitars, keyboards
 Robin Smith – keyboards
 Adrian Thomas – keyboards, engineering
 Hugh Burns – guitar
 Carrie Melbourne – bass, chapman stick
 Katherine Rockhill – piano
 Ian Thomas – drums, electronic percussion
 Jody Linscott – percussion
 Alasdair Malloy – percussion
 Pepsi Demacque – vocals
 Amar – vocals
 Rosa Cedrón – vocals
 Hamish Hamilton – director
 Rachel Holmyard – audio production

References 

Concert films
Mike Oldfield video albums
1998 video albums
1998 live albums
Live video albums